Nancy – Naturally is a studio album by Nancy Wilson released in 1966. Billy May served as the arranger and conductor, and David Cavanaugh produced the album. It entered the Billboard 200 on January 28, 1967, and remained on the chart for 21 weeks, peaking at No. 35. It reached #4 on the Hot R&B LPs chart. The song "In The Dark" was released as a single, with "Ten Years Of Tears" as the B-side.

Stephen Cook at AllMusic says, "Wilson displays all her talents" on Nancy – Naturally. "On the blues end of things, she turns the lights down low with a smoldering cover of Lil Green's classic 'In the Dark' and swings it hard and brass-heavy on the Joe Williams/Count Basie number 'Alright, Okay, You Win.' And for some of her patented ballad heaven, there are stunners like Michel Legrand's 'Watch What Happens' and Lil Armstrong's forlorn standard 'Just for a Thrill." Cook applauds Billy May's charts, saying the arranger was "adept with all the album's many moods" and concludes by stating that the record "may not be essential Wilson listening, but it still makes for a very enjoyable trip around the turntable."

Track listing

Side 1 

 "In The Dark" (Lil Green) – 2:35
 "Ten Years Of Tears" (Vicki Harrington) – 2:31
 "Since I Fell for You" (Buddy Johnson) – 3:10
 "You Ain't Had The Blues" (Ronnell Bright, Rosebud Joiner) – 2:22
 "Willow Weep For Me" (Ann Ronell) – 3:19
 "My Babe" (Willie Dixon) – 2:07

Side 2 

 "Just For A Thrill" (Don Raye, Lil Armstrong) – 2:32
 "Alright, Okay, You Win" (Mayme Watts, Sid Wyche) – 2:17
 "I Wish I Didn't Love You So" (Frank Loesser) – 3:22
 "Smack Dab In The Middle" (Charles E. Calhoun) – 2:00
 "Watch What Happens" (Michel Legrand, Norman Gimbel) – 3:00
 "Ain't That Lovin' You" (Deadric Malone) – 2:38

Personnel 

 Nancy Wilson - vocals
 Willie Smith - alto saxophone
 Wilbur Schwartz - saxophone
 Harry Klee - saxophone
 Justin Gordon - saxophone
 Charles Genty - saxophone
 Don Fagerquist - trumpet
 Tony Terran - trumpet
 Ray Triscari - trumpet
 John Audino - trumpet
 John Fowler - trumpet (2, 4, 9, 12)
 Tommy Pederson – trombone
 Lew McCreary — trombone
 Vernon Friley – trombone
 William Schaefer - trombone
 Francis Howard - trombone
 Ronnell Bright – piano
 Mike Melvoin - organ
 John Collins - guitar
 Herb Ellis - guitar (2, 4, 9, 12)
 Howard Roberts - guitar (except for 2, 4, 9, 12)
 Buster Williams - bass
 Charles Berghofer - bass
 Earl Palmer - drums
 Billy May - arranger, conductor
 David Cavanaugh - producer

From The Music of Billy May: A Discography (Greenwood Press, 1998).

References 

1966 albums
Nancy Wilson (jazz singer) albums
Capitol Records albums
Albums recorded at Capitol Studios
Albums produced by Dave Cavanaugh
Albums arranged by Billy May